The Holmes Creek Covered Bridge, also called the Lakeshore Covered Bridge, is a one-lane wooden covered bridge that crosses Holmes Creek in Charlotte, Vermont on Lake Road, adjacent to Charlotte Beach.  It was listed on the National Register of Historic Places in 1974.

The bridge is of King post truss with tied arch design, one of only 3 left standing in the state.  This bridge is also one of the shortest in the state, and it at the lowest elevation being just off the shore of Lake Champlain.

According to the placard mounted on the bridge, the town Selectmen originally specified the bridge's width and height to accommodate passage of "a load of hay, high and wide."

During the late 1800s, the Holmes family operated what is said to be the largest apple orchard in New England, located just southwest of the bridge. Offshore in Lake Champlain there are submerged pilings; the only remaining evidence of the pier where boats docked to load the fruit.

Recent history
In 1993 the bridge was rehabilitated by Milton Graton Associates, after the Vermont Agency of Transportation (AOT) found it to be inadequate for normal loading.  Additional work was done in 1994 by Paul Ide and Jan Lewandoski.  The Vermont AOT has further recommended bypassing the bridge, but thus far it is still in daily use.

In 2002, the bridge had undergone a roof replacement funded by the National Historic Covered Bridge Preservation Program, which re-roofed 38 covered bridges within the State

The July 2007 Town of Charlotte Selectboard minutes have stated that the Holmes Creek Bridge has been hit by an untold number of small trucks, where the Town has had to pay for the repairs.  The current height restriction for vehicles traveling on the bridge is posted at 8'3".

Photo gallery

See also
National Register of Historic Places listings in Chittenden County, Vermont
List of Vermont covered bridges
List of bridges on the National Register of Historic Places in Vermont

References

Buildings and structures in Charlotte, Vermont
Bridges completed in 1870
Covered bridges on the National Register of Historic Places in Vermont
King post truss bridges in the United States
Wooden bridges in Vermont
Bridges in Chittenden County, Vermont
Tourist attractions in Chittenden County, Vermont
National Register of Historic Places in Chittenden County, Vermont
Road bridges on the National Register of Historic Places in Vermont
1870 establishments in Vermont